Frank Robinson is a former American football player who played at the linebacker position for the Tulane Green Wave from 1977 to 1980. Robinson then played ten seasons in the CFL (Canadian Football League) from 1981 to 1990 with the Saskatchewan Roughriders, Winnipeg Blue Bombers, Toronto Argonauts and the Hamilton Tigercats. Robinson was a CFL East All-Star at linebacker in 1987 and an CFL All-Star in 1989.

References

External links
 Frank Robinson profile

1959 births
Living people
American players of Canadian football
Canadian football linebackers
Saskatchewan Roughriders players
Winnipeg Blue Bombers players
Toronto Argonauts players
Hamilton Tiger-Cats players
Tulane Green Wave football players
Players of American football from Virginia
People from Nassawadox, Virginia